A list of films produced by the Marathi language film industry based in Maharashtra in the year 1989.

1989 Releases 

A list of Marathi films released in 1989.

References

Lists of 1989 films by country or language
 Marathi
1989